Armor for Sleep is an American rock band from New Jersey. Their current lineup consists of lead vocalist, guitarist, and songwriter Ben Jorgensen, lead guitarist PJ DeCicco, bassist Anthony DiIonno and drummer Nash Breen.

After initial demos had been distributed, New York-based independent label Equal Vision Records signed the band and went on to release the concept-based albums, Dream to Make Believe (2003) and What to Do When You Are Dead (2005). The following year, the band signed to Sire Records and Warner Bros. and released their last album Smile for Them (2007) before a yearslong hiatus. The band announced their disbandment in October 2009, only reuniting briefly for tours in 2012 and 2015. They officially reunited in 2020 and released a new album in September 2022, The Rain Museum, on Equal Vision Records and Rude Records.

During their recording career, the band has been known for their blend of alternative rock, atmospheric emo, and dream pop.

History
Armor For Sleep was founded by Ben Jorgensen in 2001 in New Jersey. Nash Breen and Peter James "PJ" DeCicco later joined the band after leaving fellow New Jersey band Prevent Falls.  Jorgensen stated the name of the band comes from his early experiences of writing music and not being able to sleep. As he recalls, "I guess when I started the band I was kind of, like, retreating in my room and I kind of couldn't really fall asleep, so I started playing music. I just thought of the name Armor for Sleep, because it was really, the music was keeping me from passing out! Which was something I was procrastinating on."

Ben would go on to record a two-song demo containing the songs Dream to Make Believe and Slip Like Space, which would later be re-recorded and released on their first album Dream to Make Believe. Former guitarist Paul Abrahamian went on to form It's Called the Ghost Town Symphony in November 2002. Later that month, Armor for Sleep recorded a three-song demo with producer Dan Coutant; Mark Kenask of Blind Society played drums on the demo.

Armor For Sleep originally signed to Equal Vision Records, where they released their first two albums, Dream to Make Believe in 2003 and What to Do When You Are Dead in 2005. The band signed to Warner Brothers/Sire Records in 2006, explaining it was "time for a change".

A Machine Shop remix of their track "Remember to Feel Real" was featured on the Snakes on a Plane soundtrack in August 2006. The next year, the band debuted a new track entitled "End of the World" on the soundtrack for the 2007 film Transformers. This song would later appear on their next record, but with various changes, including the reduction in vocal effects and keyboards.

Armor For Sleep released their third full-length album Smile for Them on October 30, 2007.

On August 20, 2008, the band announced an extended play (EP), entitled The Way Out Is Broken.

Disbandments and reunions
On October 28, 2009, it was officially announced that the band would be parting ways. Frontman Ben Jorgensen released a statement informing fans of the inevitable, after the band had been inactive, not undertaking a tour for over a year.

The band regrouped to play the 2012 Bamboozle Festival in New Jersey, releasing the following statement:

"We have no motivation for doing this other than to get up on stage and say goodbye properly to the people out there who never got the opportunity to see us one last time. Like Sam Beckett in Quantum Leap we will strive to "put right what once went wrong"...and then just like him we will poof out of existence. But for good this time- we promise."

At the Bamboozle Festival, and on the band's Facebook page, Jorgensen announced that three more shows would be played: July 14, 2012 at Irving Plaza in New York City, July 20, 2012 at The Glass House in Pomona, California, and July 22, 2012 at the House of Blues in Chicago, Illinois.

On July 20, 2015, the band announced an eight city tour to celebrate the 10th anniversary of What To Do When You Are Dead.

Post-disbandment projects
In January 2009, Abrahamian formed the band 1984.

After the group parted ways, Ben Jorgensen briefly started an electronic project called God Loves a Challenge alongside Sierra Shardae and also embarked on a brief solo career, releasing the EP There Is Nowhere Left to Go in 2010.

PJ DeCicco moved on to playing in Love Automatic with former Senses Fail bassist Mike Glita. The band is no longer active.

Nash Breen was playing with New York Rivals, but has since joined The Cold Seas, who opened for Armor for Sleep on select dates of their What to Do When You Are Dead 10th anniversary tour in 2015 as well as the 15th anniversary tour of the aforementioned album in 2021. As of 2022, Breen remains active with both Armor for Sleep and the Cold Seas.

Return and fourth studio album
On February 24, 2020, the band announced on Facebook that they would be reuniting for a summer tour including nineteen US cities to celebrate the 15th anniversary of What to Do When You Are Dead. The tour was later postponed due to the COVID-19 pandemic, and on August 13, 2020, the band announced the new tour dates for 2021. In July 2022, the band announced a new album, The Rain Museum, which was released on September 9, 2022.

In the summer of 2022, Armor for Sleep performed on select dates of the Hello Gone Days tour, co-headlined by Dashboard Confessional and Andrew McMahon in the Wilderness.

Personnel

Line-up
Ben Jorgensen – lead vocals, rhythm guitar, piano
PJ DeCicco – lead guitar 	
Anthony DiIonno – bass, backing vocals
Nash Breen – drums, percussion

Touring Members
Nate Novarro (Cobra Starship) – drums, percussion

Discography

Studio albums
 Dream to Make Believe (2003)
 What to Do When You Are Dead (2005)
 Smile for Them (2007)
 The Rain Museum (2022)

References

External links
Official Facebook Page 	

Musical groups established in 2001
Musical groups disestablished in 2009
Musical groups reestablished in 2020
Musical groups from New Jersey
Musical quartets
Alternative rock groups from New Jersey
Emo musical groups from New Jersey
Crush Management artists
Equal Vision Records artists
2001 establishments in New Jersey